Centrolepis inconspicua is a species of plant in the Restionaceae family and is found in Western Australia.

It blooms between August and October.

It is found in beds of moss, in swamps, on the margins of salt lakes and along the margins of watercourses along the west coast in the Wheatbelt, Mid West and Peel regions of Western Australia.

References

inconspicua
Plants described in 1903
Flora of Western Australia
Poales of Australia